The 1910 Chattanooga Moccasins football team represented the University of Chattanooga as an independent during the 1910 college football season. The team finished its eight-game schedule with a record of 5–2–1.

Schedule

References

Chattanooga
Chattanooga Mocs football seasons
Chattanooga Moccasins football